The Pina is a river in Ivanava and Pinsk Raions in Belarus. The length of the river is 40 kilometers. The river flows into the city of Pinsk and is a left tributary of the Pripyat. The average gradient of Pina is 0.1 ‰. The largest tributaries are the Struha and Njaslucha.  It forms part of the Dnieper-Bug Canal.

Books
(in Belorussian, Russian and English) T.A.Khvagina (2005) POLESYE from the Bug to the Ubort, Minsk Vysheysha shkola,
(in Russian, English and Polish) Ye.N.Meshechko, A.A.Gorbatsky (2005) Belarusian Polesye: Tourist Transeuropean Water Mains, Minsk, Four Quarters.

Rivers of Brest Region
Rivers of Belarus